The Norman Aviation Nordic 8 Mini Explorer is a Canadian ultralight aircraft, designed and produced by Norman Aviation of Saint-Anselme, Quebec. The aircraft is supplied as a kit for amateur construction.

Design and development
The Mini Explorer was derived from the larger Hubert de Chevigny designed Personal Explorer, adapted to Canadian Advanced Ultralight rules. It features a strut-braced high-wing, a two-seats-in-side-by-side configuration enclosed cockpit, fixed tricycle landing gear and a single engine in tractor configuration. The Mini Explorer is intended as a flying camper and so includes sufficient cabin space with couches for two adults to sleep and a kitchen.

The aircraft fuselage is made from welded steel tubing, with wooden structure wings and all surfaces covered in doped aircraft fabric. Standard engines fitted are the  Rotax 912UL, the  Rotax 912ULS and the  Rotax 914 four-stroke turbocharged powerplant. Construction time from the supplied kit is estimated as 500 hours.

Operational history
In December 2011 the company reported four examples had been completed. In February 2018 there were three Mini-Explorers on the Transport Canada Canadian Civil Aircraft Register, including the prototype.

Specifications (Mini Explorer)

References

External links

2000s Canadian ultralight aircraft
Homebuilt aircraft
Single-engined tractor aircraft